Stanislovas Jančiukas  (5 November 1937 – 18 October 2006) was a Lithuanian fashion designer.

Biography 
In 1969, he graduated from the Art Institute in Tallinn, Estonia. In 1969–1994, he worked as an artist at the "art" factory in Vilnius.

Works 
Creator albums, diaries, notebooks, leather goods products for mass production standards, honor, reviews of books, folders, greetings and more. Works characterized by subtle forms of modeliuotė, figurative, architect. motives and style of harmony. Since 1970 participates in exhibitions and solo exhibitions held in Vilnius 1997

The most important works: the book reviews and maps exposition in the Trakai History Museum, in 1973–1975, "Album", 1976, panels and guest books ship "Lithuania", 1979, and honorary guest book at Vilnius University in 1979, a notebook with initials, 1986, photo boxes, 1988, J guestbook. Basanaviciaus Ožkabaliuose Museum, 2002.

See also 
 List of Lithuanian painters

References

External links 
 "Stanislovas Jančiukas", Lithuanian Wikipedia

1937 births
2006 deaths
Lithuanian painters
Artists from Vilnius
Lithuanian fashion designers